Welcome to the Men's Group is a 2016 American comedy-drama film directed by Joseph Culp and starring Timothy Bottoms, Stephen Tobolowsky, Terence J. Rotolo, Culp, Mackenzie Astin, Ali Saam, Phil Abrams and David Clennon.

Cast
Timothy Bottoms
Stephen Tobolowsky
Joseph Culp
David Clennon
Mackenzie Astin
Ali Saam
Terence J. Rotolo
Phil Abrams

Release
The film was released at the Ahrya Fine Arts Theater in Beverly Hills, California on May 16, 2018.

Reception
Bradley Gibson of Film Threat gave the film a 6 out of 10.

Stephen Farber of The Hollywood Reporter gave the film a positive review and wrote "The film is overlong and wildly uneven (...), but it benefits from a strong cast making the most of some sharp moments exposing the underside of male privilege and domination."

References

External links
 
 
 

2016 films
American comedy-drama films
2010s English-language films
2010s American films